Madonna with Child Enthroned between Saints John the Baptist and Sebastian is a painting by the Italian Renaissance artist Pietro Perugino, executed in 1493, and housed in the  Uffizi Gallery,  Florence.

History
The work was commissioned by Cornelia Salviati, widow of Venetian merchant  Giovanni Martini, and his son  Roberto, for the chapel of the convent of San Domenico, Fiesole, which had been perhaps restored by Giuliano da Sangallo a few years before. In 1493 Perugino had married  Chiara Fancelli, the daughter of architect Luca Fancelli: the face of the Madonna is a portrait of her.

In 1786 the panel was acquired for 1000 Italian scudi by Peter Leopold, Grand Duke of Tuscany, becoming part of the future Uffizi Gallery. The original chapel was redecorated by a painting by Lorenzo di Credi; the one now in the church is a copy by Garibaldo Ceccarelli.

It was restored in 1995.

Description
The background, this time featuring two bays, is one of the many porticoes painted by Perugino in the 1480s and 1490s (in works such as the Fano Altarpiece or the  Pietà. Also typical is the serene landscape with thin trees.

Mary sits on a high throne decorated with grotesques at the base, where it is also the signature PETRVS PERVSINVS PINXIT AN[NO MCCCCLXXXXIII (Pietro Perugia 1493). She holds the child on her knees, as he looks towards John the Baptist on the left; John, in turn, points at him. On the right is the common representation of St. Sebastian martyred by arrows, his contemplative gaze directed to the heavens.

The composition was one of the first examples in Florence of the new style of Holy Conversation elaborated  in Venice by Antonello da Messina and Giovanni Bellini a few years before, with a pyramidal development pivoting on the central figure of Mary on a high throne. The painting is also one of the first by Perugino in which the Madonna is no longer an elegant maid, but a more mature and severe woman, according to the more sober climate introduced in Florence by Girolamo Savonarola. Another example of this evolution is the Madonna with Child with St. Catherine of Alexandria in the  Kunsthistorisches Museum of Vienna.

Sources

External links
Page the museum's website 

Paintings by Pietro Perugino in the Uffizi
1493 paintings
Perugino
Perugino
Perugino